is a 1990 Japanese film directed by Masahiro Shinoda. It was chosen as Best Film at the Japan Academy Prize ceremony. It was based on a manga of the same name by Motoo Abiko.

Synopsis
The film is a story of childhood life during wartime Japan. Takeshi, the intelligent son of a fisherman, is the schoolyard bully.

When his cousin comes to stay with his family to avoid bombing raids, Takeshi at first treats him well then begins bullying him, too. Takeshi eventually loses his position of leadership.

Cast
 Tetsuya Fujita: Shinji Kazama
 Yuji Horioka: Takeshi Ohara
 Katsuhisa Yamazaki: Futoshi Tanabe
 Kensuke Sudo: Minako Saiki
 Shima Iwashita: Shizue Kazama
 Toshiyuki Hosokawa: Shusaku Kazama
 Choichiro Kawarazaki: Tatsuo Kazama
 Kazuyo Mita: Shige Kazama
 Nobuko Sendo: Akiko Tanabe
 Mitsue Suzuki: Maki Kazama
 Shinsuke Ashida: Pprincipal
 Hideji Otaki: stationmaster
 Kyosen Ohashi: photographer

Reception

Awards and nominations
14th Japan Academy Prize 
Won: Best Picture
Won: Best Director - Masahiro Shinoda
Won: Best Screenplay - Taichi Yamada 
Won: Best Music - Shin’ichirō Ikebe
Won: Best Art Direction - Takeo Kimura
Won: Best Sound Recording - Hideo Nishizaki
Won: Rookie of the Year - Tetsuya Fujita
Nominated: Best Actress - Shima Iwashita
Nominated: Best Cinematography - Tatsuo Suzuki
Nominated: Best Lighting Direction - Kenichi Mizuno
Nominated: Best Film Editing - Chizuko Osada

References

External links
 
 
 
  
 
 
 

1990 films
1990 drama films
Japanese drama films
1990s Japanese-language films
Picture of the Year Japan Academy Prize winners
1990s Japanese films